Bugaksan is a mountain north of Gyeongbokgung Palace in Seoul, also known as Baegaksan. Inwangsan, Naksan, and Namsan are the mountains that surround the Seoul Basin. The bedrock is granite and is about 342m high.

See also
List of mountains in Seoul

References

Mountains of South Korea
Mountains of Seoul